Lawrence Talbot Neal (September 22, 1844 – November 2, 1905) was an American lawyer and politician who served two terms as a U.S. Representative from Ohio from 1873 to 1877.

Early career 
Born in Parkersburg, Virginia (now West Virginia), Neal pursued classical studies.
He moved to Chillicothe, Ohio, in 1864.
He studied law.
He was admitted to the bar in 1866 and commenced practice in Chillicothe, Ohio, in 1867.
City solicitor in 1867 and 1868.
He declined to be a candidate for reelection.

Neal was elected prosecuting attorney of Ross County, Ohio, in 1870 and resigned in October 1872 to become a candidate for Congress.

Congress 
Neal was elected as a Democrat to the Forty-third and Forty-fourth Congresses (March 4, 1873 – March 3, 1877).
He was an unsuccessful candidate for reelection in 1876 to the Forty-fifth Congress and for election in 1878 to the Forty-sixth Congress.
He was an unsuccessful candidate for election to the State senate in 1887.

Later career and death 
He resumed the practice of law.
He served as delegate to the Democratic National Conventions in 1888 and 1892.
He was defeated by William McKinley for Governor of Ohio in 1893.
He died in Chillicothe, Ohio, November 2, 1905.
He was interred in Grandview Cemetery, Chillicothe, Ross County, Ohio, USA.

Sources

External links 
 

1844 births
1905 deaths
Politicians from Parkersburg, West Virginia
Politicians from Chillicothe, Ohio
County district attorneys in Ohio
Ohio lawyers
Democratic Party members of the Ohio House of Representatives
Burials at Grandview Cemetery (Chillicothe, Ohio)
19th-century American politicians
Democratic Party members of the United States House of Representatives from Ohio